Alan John Kirkman was an English footballer, who played as an inside forward in the Football League for Manchester City, Rotherham United, Newcastle United, Scunthorpe United, Torquay United and Workington.

References

1936 births
2011 deaths
Footballers from Bolton
Association football inside forwards
English footballers
Bacup Borough F.C. players
Manchester City F.C. players
Rotherham United F.C. players
Newcastle United F.C. players
Scunthorpe United F.C. players
Torquay United F.C. players
Workington A.F.C. players
Kendal Town F.C. managers
English Football League players
English football managers